Kamil Brabenec (born May 17, 1976) is a Czech professional ice hockey player who currently plays with HC Egna in the Alps Hockey League.

Brabenec previously played for HKm Zvolen, HC Kometa Brno, HC České Budějovice, HC Keramika Plzeň, Luleå HF and HC Vsetín. He won a Slovak Extraliga with HKm Zvolen (2012-2013) and a Czech Extraliga with HC Kometa Brno (2016-2017).

His father of the same name was an international basketball player for Czechoslovakia in the 1970s and 80s, and his sister  and daughter  also played that sport at a high level. His son  is a hockey player who was drafted by NHL team Vegas Golden Knights in 2021.

References

External links

1976 births
Living people
Czech ice hockey left wingers
Motor České Budějovice players
HC Kometa Brno players
HC Plzeň players
VHK Vsetín players
Ice hockey people from Brno
KLH Vajgar Jindřichův Hradec players
HKM Zvolen players
Luleå HF players
HC Nové Zámky players
Czech expatriate ice hockey players in Slovakia
Czech expatriate ice hockey players in Sweden
Czech expatriate sportspeople in Italy
Expatriate ice hockey players in Italy